Mondon is a commune in the Doubs department in the Bourgogne-Franche-Comté region in eastern France.

Geography
Above the village, there is a view toward the Vosges mountains and the Ballon de Servance.

Population

See also
 Communes of the Doubs department

References

External links

 Mondon on the intercommunal Web site of the department 

Communes of Doubs